Lehqorbani may refer to:
 Lehqorbani-ye Olya
 Lehqorbani-ye Sofla